Timothy W. Ryback is an historian and director of the Institute for Historical Justice and Reconciliation in The Hague. He previously served as the Deputy-Secretary General of the Académie Diplomatique Internationale in Paris, and Director and Vice President of the Salzburg Global Seminar. Prior to this, he was a lecturer in the Concentration of History and Literature at Harvard University. Ryback has a doctorate.

Ryback has written on European history, politics and culture for numerous publications, including The Atlantic Monthly, The New Yorker, The New York Times and The Wall Street Journal. He is also author of Hitler's Private Library: The Books That Shaped His Life, published in 2008, which has appeared in more than 25 editions around the world. His book, The Last Survivor: Legacies of Dachau was a New York Times Notable Book for 2000. Ryback is also author of Rock Around the Bloc: A History of Rock Music in Eastern Europe and the Soviet Union, published in 1989. He has appeared in numerous television documentaries.

Selected works

References

Harvard University staff
Living people
1954 births